Zvěřina (feminine Zvěřinová) is a Czech surname. Notable people include:

 František Bohumír Zvěřina, Czech painter
 Jana Zvěřinová, Czech canoeist
 Jaroslav Zvěřina, Czech politician
 Martina Zvěřinová, Czech orienteer

Czech-language surnames